Fraxinus xanthoxyloides, the Afghan ash or Algerian ash, is a species of ash tree. It is found from Morocco to China. Some authorities originally described the African specimens as a distinct species, Fraxinus dimorpha.

References 

xanthoxyloides
Flora of Africa
Flora of Asia
Flora of the Mediterranean Basin